Love Me, Love Me Not is a Canadian drama film, directed by Sylvie Groulx and released in 1996. Groulx's only narrative feature film within a career otherwise making documentary films, the film stars Lucie Laurier as Winnifred, a teenage single mother raising her baby on her own after being abandoned by her boyfriend and disowned by her mother her during the pregnancy.

Cast
 Lucie Laurier
 Dominic Darceuil
 Patrick Labbé 
 Caroline Néron
 Manon Miclette 
 Sylvie Léonard

Production
The most gruesome scene for Lucie Laurier remains the one where Winnie poses naked in front of a class of young artists. She said, "Filming is one thing and seeing yourself on the screen is another. Even if it's not easy to shoot naked in front of 30 people, and I was shaking like a leaf, it didn't bother me too much, because there was great respect on the set. But on screen, this scene, frankly, I didn't find it beautiful at all! I console myself by telling myself that I was not playing a pin-up ..."

Awards
Miclette received a Genie Award nomination for Best Supporting Actress at the 17th Genie Awards.

References

External links

 

1996 films
Canadian drama films
Films set in Quebec
Films shot in Quebec
National Film Board of Canada films
Quebec films
French-language Canadian films
1990s Canadian films